Before 1989, Romania was among the top ten arms exporters in the world, however its arms industry declined considerably during the 1990s. Exports fell from roughly $1 billion before 1989 to about $43 million in 2006, and the number of employees also fell from 220,000 in 1990 to 20,000 in 2009. Sales to the Romanian Armed Forces have plunged after Romania's accession to NATO in 2004, as factories continue to produce Warsaw Pact-caliber weapons and ammunition, which are incompatible with their Western counterparts.

As of 2009, sales are roughly evenly divided between the Romanian state and foreign customers such as European Union and Arab countries such as Egypt, Algeria and Iraq. Other countries which have shown interest in Romanian equipment include Afghanistan, Israel, Switzerland, the United States, the United Arab Emirates, India, Georgia and a slew of African countries. There have been some signs of slight recovery, with exports reaching €141 million in 2009. However, the arms industry in Romania still lags behind neighboring countries such as Ukraine, Bulgaria and Serbia.

In recent years, the Romanian government has called, unsuccessfully, for the lifting of the European Union arms embargo on the People's Republic of China.

Manufacturers
Romtehnica
ROMARM
Uzinele Mecanice Cugir
Uzina Automecanica Moreni
Carfil Braşov
Industria Aeronautică Română

Weapons and equipment

Small arms
PA md. 86 assault rifle and carbine
PM md. 63/65/90 assault rifle and carbine
Pistol model 2000 handgun
RATMIL SMG submachine gun
Mitralieră md. 93 5.45×39mm LMG
PM md. 64 7.62×39mm light machine gun
PSL sniper rifle
Dracula md. 98 machine pistol
Mitraliera md. 66 7.62×54mmR Machine Gun
PKT 7.62×54mmR Tank Machine Gun
DShK 12,7x108mm Heavy Machine Gun
ZPU 14,5x114mm x1 x2 x4 Heavy Machine Gun
AG-7 rocket propelled grenade
AG-9 Rocket propelled grenade
CA-94 surface-to-air missile system

AFVs
TR-77-580 main battle tank
TR-85/TR-85 M1 main battle tank
TR-125 main battle tank
MLI-84/MLI-84M infantry fighting vehicle
MLVM tracked armored personnel carrier
TAB-71 armored personnel carrier
TAB-77 armored personnel carrier
ABC-79M armored personnel carrier
B33 Zimbru armored personnel carrier
Saur 1 armored personnel carrier
Saur-2 armored personnel carrier
ARO-244 ABI armored 4x4 vehicle 
CA-95 mobile anti-air missile system

Artillery
M-1980/1988 30 mm x 3 towed anti-aircraft gun 
M-1988 60 mm infantry mortar
M-1977 81/82 mm infantry mortar
M-1982 120 mm infantry mortar
M-1982 76 mm mountain gun M48
M-1993 98 mm mountain howitzer
M-1977 100 mm antitank gun 2A19/T-12 antitank gun 
M-1982 130 mm towed field gun M1954 (M-46)
M-1981 152 mm towed gun-howitzer M1955 (D-20)
M-1985 152 mm howitzer 2A65
M-1989 122 mm self-propelled howitzer 2S1
LAROM MLRS 122 mm x 20 rockets x 2 / 160 mm x 13 rockets x 2  
ATROM 155mm self-propelled howitzer System

Aircraft
IAR 316
IAR 330
IAR 99
IAR-93

Weapons produced during World War II and the Interwar period

Non-self-propelled weapons

Romanian monthly armament production (October 1942)

AFVs

Aircraft
IAR 14 fighter (20 built)
IAR 80 fighter (448 built)
IAR 37 reconnaissance and light bomber (380 built)
Morane-Saulnier MS 35 (30 built)
Potez 25 (250 built)
Fleet 10G (220 built)
PZL P.11 (95 built)
PZL P.24 (25 built)

Warships
Amiral-Murgescu minelaying destroyer escort
Rechinul submarine
Marsuinul submarine
DB-13-class minesweeper (4 built)
Dutch-designed torpedo boats (6 built)
S-boats (over 10 re-assembled for the Kriegsmarine)
Type IIB U-boats (6 re-assembled for the Kriegsmarine)

Weapons produced during World War I and prior

Artillery
Obuzierul Krupp, calibrul 105 mm, model 1912 (120 built)
250 mm Negrei Model 1916 heavy mortar (unknown numbers)
57 mm Burileanu anti-aircraft gun system (132 built)

Aircraft
A Vlaicu I trainer (1 built)
A Vlaicu II trainer (1 built)
A Vlaicu III trainer (1 built)

Warships
Brătianu-class river monitor (4 assembled)

References 

Defence companies of Romania
Romania
Economy of Romania